Epiamomum is a genus of plants in the family Zingiberaceae and tribe Alpinieae; all records to date are from Borneo island.  Before 2018, some species were placed in the genus Amomum.

Species
Plants of the World Online includes:
 Epiamomum angustipetalum (S.Sakai & Nagam.) A.D.Poulsen & Škorničk., 2018
 Epiamomum borneense (K.Schum.) A.D.Poulsen & Škorničk., 2018
 Epiamomum epiphyticum (R.M.Sm.) A.D.Poulsen & Škorničk., 2018
 Epiamomum hansenii (R.M.Sm.) A.D.Poulsen & Škorničk., 2018
 Epiamomum pungens (R.M.Sm.) A.D.Poulsen & Škorničk., 2018
 Epiamomum roseisquamosum (Nagam. & S.Sakai) A.D.Poulsen & Škorničk., 2018

References

External links
 

Flora of Malesia
Zingiberales genera
Alpinioideae